Mark Green (born April 8, 1959) is an American professional stock car racing driver. He is the brother of drivers, Jeff Green and David Green.

Beginnings
Mark Green began his racing career in 1973, racing go-karts in the Southern Indiana Racing Association. During his tenure, he won six consecutive championships. He then moved on to the late model division at several local speedways. Among the tracks he competed on were Nashville Speedway USA, Beech Bend Raceway and Kentucky Motor Speedway. From 1988 to 1991, he also competed in the All-American Challenge Series. In 1993, he won 16 of 20 races at Beech Bend and won the track championships there, from 1991 to 1993.

1995–2000
Green made his Busch debut in 1995 at Indianapolis Raceway Park. He qualified the #41 Brewco Motorsports Chevrolet in the twenty-eighth spot and finished eighteenth. He signed to run ten more races in 1996, in the #37 Timber Wolf-sponsored Chevy. He posted his first career top-ten at Myrtle Beach Speedway, where he finished tenth, in addition to qualifying on the outside pole. In 1997, Green and Brewco ran the full schedule, posting five top-tens including a career-best fifth-place finish at Charlotte Motor Speedway. He finished 11th in points. Green also ran two Craftsman Truck Series races that year for Brewco, finishing eleventh at IRP.

In 1998, Green continued to drive for Brewco, but only had four top-ten finishes. After his thirteenth-place points finish, Green departed from the team. He joined Washington-Erving Motorsports, driving the #50 Dr Pepper-sponsored Chevy. His best finish that season was tenth at the Yellow Freight 300 and he dropped to 21st in the standings. He exited the ride due to a lack of funding and drove the #63 Exxon-sponsored Chevy for HVP Motorsports and had a seventh-place run at Talladega Superspeedway.

2001–2005
In 2001, Green was announced as the driver of the #55 Davis & Weight Motorsports Ford Taurus in the Busch Series. After two top-twenty finishes early in the season, Davis & Weight announced it was closing its Busch team to run the Winston Cup Series. When that deal failed to materialize, Green ran out the remainder of the schedule for various teams, his best finish a ninth at Kansas Speedway for ST Motorsports. He also made his first Cup attempt at the NAPA 500 in the #41 for A.J. Foyt Racing, but failed to qualify.

Green began 2002 without a full-time ride. He began driving the #38 Deka Batteries-sponsored Ford for Akins Motorsports, sharing the ride with Christian Elder. He had to miss some time after suffering a broken left foot in a hard crash on the last lap during the spring race at Bristol Motor Speedway with Larry Foyt. He had a second-place qualifying effort at Pikes Peak International Raceway, and ten top-twenty finishes before winding up 32nd in the points. In 2003, he lost his ride and drove five Busch races for various teams, his best finish a 20th at the Stacker 200 for ORTEC Racing. He attempted the Cup race at Lowe's Motor Speedway for Foyt again, but did not qualify.

Green drove various cars for Jay Robinson Racing in 2004. His best finish for Robinson was a 21st at Nazareth Speedway in the #49 Advil Ford. Late in the season, he departed JRR and signed with the fledgling Keith Coleman Racing team, piloting the #26 lovefifi.com Chevrolet. In five starts with KCR, his best finish came at Atlanta Motor Speedway, where he finished 23rd. He began 2005 in the #7 Boudreaux's Butt Paste-sponsored Chevy for GIC-Mixon Motorsports, but returned to KCR to drive its #23 Vassarette-sponsored Chevy, finishing 11th at Talladega. He was released towards the end of the season.

2006–2008

Green was announced as the driver of the #4 Geico-sponsored Dodge Charger for Biagi Brothers Racing in 2006, and opened the year with a tenth-place finish at the Hershey's Kissables 300. Despite two additional fifteenth-place runs, he was dismissed early in the season, replaced by rookie Auggie Vidovich II. After beginning the 2007 season as a test driver for Michael Waltrip Racing, he replaced Justin Diercks in the 70 car owned by ML Motorsports, and finished the year with the team, his best finish being 19th at Gateway. Still with ML Motorsports in 2008, Green had a best finish of 5th at Talladega. Green would go on to post three more top 15s, and had a chance to win at Memphis Motorsports Park before an engine problem put him out of contention.

2009–present
Green started 2009 with the team again. However, Green failed to qualify for the race at Bristol Motor Speedway, and lost his ride shortly thereafter. He then joined JD Motorsports as the driver of the #0 car.
After several races, Green swapped with Kertus Davis to join Jay Robinson Racing to drive the 49 car. The #49 car and Mark Green were sponsored by Getmorevacations.com for a portion of the 2009 season. When Getmorevacations.com dropped out of the sponsor position, Juggle.com began to give support. Green finished in 26th place in the final race of 2009 at the Homestead-Miami Speedway.
2010 brought Green back with Jay Robinson splitting time between the #49, and #70 cars. In most of the races that Green was in the #49, he was a Start and Park. When he was in the #70 (which was a partnership between JRR and ML Motorsports) he ran the distance and had moderate success with several top 25 finishes, and a couple of top 20 finishes.

It was reported that Green had retired in 2011, but ended up driving the #49 car for Jay Robinson Racing during the latter half of the season. In 2012, Green returned for the NASCAR Sprint Cup Series race in the fall at Richmond International Raceway, driving the No. 0 Toyota for SS Motorsports, but failed to qualify for the event. Green currently serves as Director of Driver Development for REV Racing, as well as serving as a test driver for the team.

In 2021, Green drove the No. 02 Chevrolet for Young's Motorsports in the ARCA Menards Series race at the Mid-Ohio Sports Car Course in place of regular driver Toni Breidinger, his first start in the series since 2001 as well as his first start in a NASCAR sanctioned event since 2011.

Motorsports career results

NASCAR
(key) (Bold – Pole position awarded by qualifying time. Italics – Pole position earned by points standings or practice time. * – Most laps led.)

Sprint Cup Series

Nationwide Series

Craftsman Truck Series

ARCA Menards Series
(key) (Bold – Pole position awarded by qualifying time. Italics – Pole position earned by points standings or practice time. * – Most laps led.)

Images

References

External links
 Mark Green.com
 

Living people
1959 births
Sportspeople from Owensboro, Kentucky
Racing drivers from Owensboro, Kentucky
Racing drivers from Kentucky
NASCAR drivers
American Speed Association drivers
ARCA Menards Series drivers
A. J. Foyt Enterprises drivers
Michael Waltrip Racing drivers